MS Tala, also known as Tala Youth Center, or simply Tala YC, is an Egyptian sports club based in Tala, El Monufia, Egypt. The club is mainly known for its football team, which currently plays in the Egyptian Second Division, the second-highest league in the Egyptian football league system.

The club became popular after reaching the round of 32 of the 2013 Egypt Cup, where they played against defending champions ENPPI and lost 1–0.

The club was promoted to the Egyptian Second Division for the first time in their history during the 2013–14 season of the Egyptian Third Division, but failed to stay in the Second Division for more than one season and were relegated to the Third Division. Five years later, the club was promoted to the Egyptian Second Division for the second time after securing 2017–18 Egyptian Third Division Group G promotion spot by defeating Mega Sport 3–2.

Current squad

(captain)

References

Egyptian Second Division
Football clubs in Egypt
Sports clubs in Egypt